Oatlands may refer to the following places:

Australia
Oatlands, New South Wales, a suburb of Sydney
Oatlands, Tasmania
Oatlands Primary School, Narre Warren, Victoria

Ireland
Oatlands College

United Kingdom
Oatlands, Glasgow, Scotland
Oatlands, North Yorkshire, England
Oatlands, Surrey, England
Oatlands Palace, former palace at Oatlands, Surrey
Oatlands railway station, Cumbria, England

United States
Oatlands Plantation, Leesburg, Virginia

See also 
 Oatland, Ontario, Canada